The Tomb of Eve, also known as Eve's Grave and Eve's Tomb, is an archeological site located in Jeddah, Saudi Arabia.  It is considered by some Muslims to be the burial place of Eve. Prince Faisal, Viceroy of Hejaz, destroyed it in 1928. In 1975, the site was also sealed with concrete by religious authorities, who disapprove of pilgrims praying at tombs.

Richard Francis Burton mentions seeing it in his translation of the Book of a Thousand Nights and a Night.

According to the Islamic religion, Eve is considered the grandmother of humanity, which influenced the name "Jeddah" meaning grandmother in Arabic.

Mentions
Angelo Pesce mentions the site in his book on Jeddah and the earliest documented reference to the tomb:

British Acting Consul S. R. Jordan, writing in early 1926, describes the tomb as follows:

Dimensions

Émile-Félix Gautier estimates the length of the tomb to about 130 m.

The publicist Sirdar Ikbal Ali Shah mentions about the dimensions:

Aun Ar-Rafiq (Amir in Hijaz 1882–1905) tried to demolish the tomb, but that caused a public outcry. He then said: "But think you that 'our mother' was so tall? If the stupidity is international, let the tomb stand".

Gallery

References

Citations

Sources

 Lawrence, T.E. (1921).  Seven Pillars of Wisdom.  Chapter VIII.

External links
 In unmarked Saudi tomb lies 'grandmother of everyone'
 'Historic Jeddah' on Saudi Commission on Tourism & Activities
 Time Magazine on Tomb of Eve, Jeddah
 Press Herald: Pilgrims search for biblical Eve
 Encyclopædia Britannica mention Tomb of Eve in Jeddah article

Adam and Eve
Buildings and structures in Jeddah
History of Jeddah
Demolished buildings and structures in Saudi Arabia
Archaeological sites in Saudi Arabia
Eve
Sunni cemeteries
Women and death
Islamic shrines in Saudi Arabia